Bogusław Psujek (22 November 1956 – 21 April 1990) was a Polish long-distance runner who specialised in the marathon. His most prominent victory was at the 1986 Berlin Marathon, which he won in a course record of 2:11:03 hours. He also won the Beppu-Ōita Marathon in 1990. He achieved his highest global ranking of ninth in the 1990 season, with a then Polish national record run of 2:10:26 hours in a seventh-place finish at the 1987 London Marathon.

At international level he was a three-time competitor at the IAAF World Cross Country Championships, running in 1981, 1986 and 1987, and his best finish there was 114th. He represented his country on home turf in Warsaw at the 1987 IAAF World Cross Country Championships, placing 145th overall and helping Poland to 17th in the team rankings alongside Krzysztof Wesołowski, Bogusław Mamiński, Jan Huruk, Sławomir Gurny, and Andrzej Malicki. Psujek ran in the 1987 World Championships marathon later that year, but failed to finish. He also ran at the 1987 European Cup 10,000 m, placing 6th, and the 1988 European Marathon Cup, placing 33rd.

At the Polish national championships he won two indoor titles over 3000 metres, four outdoor titles in the 5000 metres and one title in the 10,000 metres. He was also a three-time winner of the Polish Cross Country Championships.

Among his individual performances were a win at the Cross Ala dei Sardi and Janusz Kusocinski Memorial in 1985, and two wins at the Trzebnica Sylwester Race in 1986 and 1987. In marathons, he placed seventh at the 1987 New York City Marathon and fourth at the 1988 Berlin Marathon.

Psujek was born in Krasnystaw and died in Szklarska Poręba. He died at the age of 33, having suffered a fall late at night outside the hotel he was staying at. He left a wife and two sons. He was a member of the WKS Oleśniczanka sports club and the club holds an annual memorial road running competition in his honour in Oleśnica.

International competitions

Road races

National titles
Polish Athletics Championships
5000 m: 1981, 1982, 1985 (shared with Wojciech Jaworski), 1986
10,000 m: 1986
Polish Indoor Athletics Championships
3000 m: 1982, 1985

Personal bests

See also
List of 5000 metres national champions (men)

References

External links

1956 births
1990 deaths
People from Krasnystaw
Sportspeople from Lublin Voivodeship
Polish male long-distance runners
Polish male marathon runners
Polish male cross country runners